Zago is an Italian surname derived from the Greek word διάκος (diákos, "deacon") and originally referred to a religious authority of the minor orders. It is most prevalent in the northern regions of Veneto, Lombardia and Piemonte and is also to be found among the Brazilian, French and Argentinian Italian diaspora.

People with the surname Zago

 Alvise Zago (born 1969), former Italian footballer
 Antônio Carlos Zago (born 1969), former Brazilian footballer
 Bruno Zago (born 1919), former Italian footballer
 Emilio Zago (1852–1929), Italian actor
 Fernand Zago (born 1942), former French rugby player
 Frédéric Zago (born 1963), former French footballer
 Giuseppe Zago (1881–1947), Italian actor
 Luigi Zago (1894–1952), Italian painter
 Marcello Zago (1932–2001), Italian priest
 Marco Antonio Zago (born 1946), Brazilian physician
 Santo Zago (16th-century), Italian painter
 Valentina Zago (born 1990), Italian volleyballer

References

Italian-language surnames
Surnames of Italian origin
Occupational surnames